Thomas Francis Callahan (June 2, 1921 – October 3, 1996) was an American professional basketball player. He played collegiately for Rockhurst University. Callahan played for the Providence Steamrollers in the BAA for 13 games during the 1946–47 season.

BAA career statistics

Regular season

References

External links

1921 births
1996 deaths
American men's basketball players
Basketball players from Connecticut
Guards (basketball)
Providence Steamrollers players
Rockhurst Hawks men's basketball players
Sportspeople from Stamford, Connecticut